Stone Mountain State Park is a  North Carolina state park in Alleghany County and Wilkes County, North Carolina.

Stone Mountain

The centerpiece of the park is Stone Mountain, a dome of exposed granite (specifically a quartz diorite to granodiorite) of Devonian age, which has intruded into the gneiss of the Precambrian Alligator Back Formation. It rises sharply over 600 feet (183 m) above the surrounding terrain. The mountain, which has an elevation of 2,305 feet (706 m) above sea level, is known for its barren sides and distinctive brown-gray color, and can be seen for miles. The mountain offers some of the best rock climbing in North Carolina, and the park's creeks and streams feature excellent brook trout fishing.

Because the mountain is the best example of a monadnock in massive granite in North Carolina it was designated a National Natural Landmark in May 1974.

Museums and historic site
The park visitor center features the Mountain Culture Exhibit including mountain settler life and artifacts, and natural history including trout, butterflies and moths.

The mid-19th century Hutchinson Homestead includes a log cabin, barn, blacksmith shop, corncrib, meat house, and original furnishings.  The Homestead is open Thursday through Sunday from March – October. The grounds can be visited year round.

The 1897 Garden Creek Baptist Church continues to hold services seasonally.  Visitors can walk the grounds when the church is closed.

Things to do 
Within the park there are numerous outdoor activities to partake in. The park has established rock climbing, hiking, and camping sites.

Nearby state parks
The following state parks are within  of Stone Mountain State Park:
Elk Knob State Park
Grayson Highlands State Park, Virginia
Mount Jefferson State Natural Area
New River State Park
New River Trail State Park, Virginia
Pilot Mountain State Park
Rendezvous Mountain State Park

References

External links

 

State parks of North Carolina
State parks of the Appalachians
National Natural Landmarks in North Carolina
Open-air museums in North Carolina
History museums in North Carolina
Museums in Alleghany County, North Carolina
Museums in Wilkes County, North Carolina
Inselbergs of Piedmont (United States)
Protected areas established in 1975
Protected areas of Alleghany County, North Carolina
Protected areas of Wilkes County, North Carolina